Scopula dignata is a moth of the family Geometridae. It is endemic to Russia.

References

Moths described in 1858
dignata
Endemic fauna of Russia
Moths of Asia
Taxa named by Achille Guenée